Alapaha Colored School is a historic school building in Alapaha, Georgia, located on Henry Street South of the junction with George Street.  It is one of the last surviving two-story wood-frame African-American school buildings in Georgia.  It was built with a brick foundation in 1924. There are two rooms downstairs and one large room upstairs. It was the school serving the local African-American community from 1924 until 1954.  It was added to the National Register of Historic Places on July 11, 2002.

In 1945 a one-story ell was added in the rear of the building.  In 1954, African-American community school in the area were consolidated into one, the Nashville High and Elementary School.

See also
National Register of Historic Places listings in Berrien County, Georgia

References

External links
 

School buildings on the National Register of Historic Places in Georgia (U.S. state)
Buildings and structures in Berrien County, Georgia
School buildings completed in 1924
National Register of Historic Places in Berrien County, Georgia
1924 establishments in Georgia (U.S. state)